The 1980–81 DDR-Oberliga season was the 33rd season of the DDR-Oberliga, the top level of ice hockey in East Germany. Two teams participated in the league, and SG Dynamo Weißwasser won the championship.

Game results

Dynamo Weißwasser wins series 7:5 in points.

References

External links
East German results 1970-1990

1989-90
Ger
Oberliga
1980 in East German sport
1981 in East German sport